Isidro Kintanar y Camasura (May 14, 1915 – April 8, 1968) was a Filipino Visayan lawyer, politician, and legislator from Cebu, Philippines. He was elected mayor of the municipality of Argao (1952–1954) and Member of the House of Representatives for Cebu's 4th legislative district (1953–1968).

Early life 
The son of Carmiano Kintanar and Sofia Camasura, Isidro C. Kintanar was born in Talaytay, Argao, Cebu on May 14, 1915, and he attended Visayan Institute (now University of the Visayas) where he was involved in the school paper and the student council. Then, he took up law at the University of Manila in 1940 and became a lawyer on June 7, 1946. He married Fidele Acedero.

Career 
While attending college, he supported his studies working as employee at the Oriental Glass Palace in Cebu and as a clerk at the Bureau of Posts in Manila. Before World War II, he worked as an employee of the Cavite Navy Yard starting in 1940. After the war, he tried to practice law but his firm failed. Later on, he became an agent of the National Bureau of Investigation starting in 1948.

In 1952, he became mayor of the municipality of Argao, Cebu. However, he was suspended by President Elpidio Quirino on April 18, 1952 due to a suit alleging falsification of public documents. The suspension order was delivered through Cebu Governor Sergio Osmeña Jr.

Kintanar was affiliated with the Nacionalista Party. Succeeding his brother Filomeno Kintanar who declined to campaign for another term, he was elected member of the Congress of the Republic representing Cebu's 4th district in 1954 and served for four consecutive terms until 1968. He was involved in the committees of ways and means, reorganization, judiciary, government enterprises, anti-Filipino activities, and fishing and industry. Known for his cautious approach, his plans and implementation of government reorganization prevented redundancy and duplication functions.

In 1957, he was the Philippine delegate in the Inter-Parliamentary Union Congress conducted in Nice, France. On that same year, President Carlos P. Garcia ruled on the administrative case lodged by Kintanar, Ramon Durano, and Miguel Cuenco against incumbent Governor Sergio Osmeña Jr. and Cebu Provincial Board Members Fructuoso Cabahug and Pedro Uy Calderon. The complaint claimed that the land swap between the Cebu provincial government and the real estate company Cebu Heights Co., of which Osmeña was the primary stockholder and President, was disadvantageous to the province. Garcia exonerated Osmeña, Cabahug and Calderon, and he also created a committee that would assess the fair value of the concerned properties.
 
While serving his last term in Congress, he died of heart attack on April 8, 1968.

Historical commemoration 

 Formerly known as Cebu South General Hospital, the Isidro C. Kintanar Memorial Hospital located Barangay Poblacion in the municipality of Argao, Cebu was renamed in his honor by virtue of Republic Act 5720 enacted on June 21, 1969.
The 100-bed hospital constructed in Barangay Bogo, Argao was given the name new Isidro C. Kintanar Memorial Hospital and was inaugurated on January 30, 2018.
The Isidro Kintanar Street in Barangay Poblacion, Argao was also named in his honor.

References 

1915 births
1968 deaths
Members of the House of Representatives of the Philippines from Cebu
University of the Visayas alumni
20th-century Filipino lawyers
University of Manila alumni
Mayors of places in Cebu
Nacionalista Party politicians